The Cupola gecko (Mokopirirakau "cupola") is a species of gecko. Cupola is not its official scientific name; it is yet to be authorised as a separate species, and this term, named after the Cupola Basin in the Nelson Lakes National Park where it was first discovered, is used as a placeholder. It is endemic to New Zealand. It has only been confirmed to be present in two places, the Cupola Basin in the Nelson Lakes National Park, and the Sabine Valley.

In March 2021, 53 years after the first sighting, and 14 years after the last confirmed sighting, four cupola geckos, including a pregnant female, were found in the Sabine Valley in an expedition headed by herpetologist Ben Barr.

Description 
Very few recorded specimens of the Cupola gecko exist. It is similar in appearance to other forest geckos, having a grey-brown colour with dark W or V shaped bands or blotches. It differs from other related species in that it has a shorter snout and a triangular shaped head with V-shaped markings. It has a speckled undersurface, a bright orange mouth lining, and grey/brown eyes. The sizes of adult specimens are unknown, but probably measure around 70-85mm. Juveniles are dark grey-brown with grey chevron markings and scatted spots of mustard yellow.

Distribution 
The Cupola gecko is only known to exist in the Cupola Basin and the Sabine Valley. The first Cupola Basin specimen was found in a scrubby boulder field not far above the Cupola Basin hut.

Conservation status 
The Department of Conservation classifies the Cupola gecko as Data Deficient under the New Zealand Threat Classification System.

See also
Geckos of New Zealand

References

Mokopirirakau
Endemic fauna of New Zealand
Reptiles of New Zealand
Undescribed vertebrate species
Endemic reptiles of New Zealand